This page lists the World Best Year Performance in the year 1995 in both the men's and the women's hammer throw. The main event during this season were the IAAF World Championships in Gothenburg, Sweden, where the men's final was held on Sunday August 6, 1995.

Men

Records

1995 World Year Ranking

Women

Records

1995 World Year Ranking

References
digilander
apulanta
apulanta
hammerthrow.wz

1995
Hammer Throw Year Ranking, 1995